I Thought About You: A Tribute to Chet Baker is the twenty-second studio album by Brazilian jazz pianist and singer Eliane Elias. It was released on  May 28, 2013, via Concord Picante label. The album is dedicated to American jazz trumpeter and vocalist Chet Baker. On this record she performs famous jazz standards and compositions.

Reception
Christopher Loudon of Jazz Times stated "Its release timed to coincide with the 25th anniversary of Chet Baker’s death, Eliane Elias’ I Thought About You is the most satisfying of the many Baker tributes that have surfaced of late, because the Brazilian pianist and vocalist so keenly appreciates a key shared attribute. Like the perennially misunderstood Baker, wrongfully pegged as a tragedian, Elias is first and foremost a sensualist". Matt Collar of Allmusic wrote "Pianist and vocalist Eliane Elias pays tribute to legendary jazz trumpeter/vocalist Chet Baker on her 2013 album I Thought About You. Featuring a selection of standards strongly associated with Baker, Elias mixes her native Brazilian bossa nova with swing, straight-ahead jazz, and even a few bluesy flourishes with much aplomb. " Jeff Simon of The Buffalo News commented, "Her slow sinuous version of Neal Hefti’s “Girl Talk” is among the many jazz versions which will never begin to equal Ray Bryant's, but it's hard not to love it anyway."

Track listing

Personnel
 Eliane Elias – piano, vocals
 Randy Brecker – trumpet, flugelhorn 
 Steve Cardenas – electric guitar
 Oscar Castro-Neves – acoustic guitar
 Marc Johnson – double bass
 Rafael Barata – drums
 Victor Lewis  – drums
 Marivaldo Dos Santos – percussion

Chart positions

References

External links

2013 albums
Eliane Elias albums
Cultural depictions of Chet Baker